Eryngium jaliscense is a plant species native to the Mexican State of Jalisco.

Leaves are long and linear, tapering toward the tip and with long hairs along the margins. Leaves along the stem are similar but not as long. Flowers are whitish, grouped into heads, the heads arranged like a cyme.

References

jaliscense
Flora of Jalisco
Endemic flora of Mexico
Taxa named by Mildred Esther Mathias
Taxa named by Lincoln Constance